Contat is a French surname.

List of people with the surname 

 Émilie Contat (1770–1846), French actress
 Florence Blatrix-Contat (born 1966), French politician
 Louise Contat (1760–1813), French actress

See also 

Surnames
Surnames of French origin
French-language surnames